The Trumpchi GS3 is a subcompact crossover SUV produced by GAC Group under the Trumpchi brand in China and the GAC Motor brand globally.

Overview
The Trumpchi GS3 is based on the same platform as the Trumpchi GA3S sedan, and it debuted on the 2017 Chengdu Auto Show and the 2018 Detroit Auto Show and was launch on the Chinese car market soon after with prices ranging from 73,800 to 116,800 yuan.

Powertrain
The engines available includes a 1.3L turbo producing 137hp and a 1.5L producing 114hp, both mated to a 5-speed manual or a 6-speed automatic.

Foreign market
The GS3 was launched in the Philippines in October 2019, less than a year after GAC Motor debuted in the country.

In December 2021, the GAC GS3 was introduced in Malaysia under the Tan Chong administration. Two variants are on offer, with a single 1.5L NA + 6AT combo.

Trumpchi GS3 Power
The Trumpchi GS3 Power is the facelift unveiled for the 2021 model year and was sold alongside the pre-facelift model as a more premium option. The Trumpchi GS3 Power is available with a 1.5 liter Turbo PFI inline-three engine producing 150 PS at 5,500 rpm and 226 Nm from 1,500 to 4,000 rpm, and the 1.5 liter TGDi engine developing 177 PS at 5,500 rpm and 255 Nm from 1,500 to 4,000 rpm. Suspension setup of the GS3 Power is MacPherson struts for the front suspension and torsion beam suspension for the rear, disc brakes on all four corners with ventilated front units and solid rears. Electric power steering is also standard.

See also
 List of GAC vehicles

References

External links

 
 (Global)

Crossover sport utility vehicles
Front-wheel-drive vehicles
Cars introduced in 2017
Cars of China
GS3